Charmoses is a genus in the family Cossidae, of which the only member species is the moth Charmoses dumigani. Charmoses dumigani is found in Australia, where it has been recorded from Queensland and New South Wales.

References

Natural History Museum Lepidoptera generic names catalog

Cossidae
Moths of Australia
Cossidae genera
Monotypic moth genera